Coleomyia is a genus of robber flies in the family Asilidae. There are about eight described species in Coleomyia.

Species
These eight species belong to the genus Coleomyia:
 Coleomyia albula (Melander, 1924)
 Coleomyia alticola James, 1941
 Coleomyia crumborum Martin, 1953
 Coleomyia hinei Wilcox & Martin, 1935
 Coleomyia rainieri Wilcox & Martin, 1935
 Coleomyia rubida Martin, 1953
 Coleomyia sculleni Wilcox & Martin, 1935
 Coleomyia setigera (Cole, 1919)

References

Further reading

 
 
 

Asilidae genera
Articles created by Qbugbot